Sultan Kot ) is a small town, it is situated in Shikarpur, Sindh, Pakistan, and its original name (with diacritics) is Sultān Kot.
it has a Railway station named Sultan Kot railway station and Police Station. Sultan Kot is also linked to N-65 National Highway Via Shikarpur, Jacobabad.
Sultan kot also have a branch of HBL Bank, connected to the N-65 National Highway. Sultan kot is historically famous because of its Agha Family (Babar Pathan) which has been the ruling family of the area for decades. Famous Personalities of Sultan Kot are Sardar Sultan Muhammad Khan, Sardar Muhammad Raheem Khan, Arsala Khan, Sardar Abdul Kareem Khan, Khan Bahadur Agha Jan Muhammad Khan Pathan, Khan Bahadur Mir Ahmed Khan, Khan Bahadur Agha Nizamuddin Khan, Khan Sahib Sardar Saifuddin Khan Pathan, Khan Sahib Agha Hisamuddin Khan, Sardar Ayoub Khan,Sardar Sultan Khan II (Bhora Khan) Senator Agha Ghulam Nabi, MNA Major Atta Muhammad Khan, MPA Agha Tariq Khan, Agha Sunny Khan Pathan, Agha Baderuddin Advocate, Barrister Agha Saifuddin Khan, Nasrallah khan Babar, Abdul Rehman Khan, Agha Nooruddin Khan, and Agha Jan Akhtar.

See also
Mian Sahib
Shikarpur, Sindh
Jacobabad

References 

Populated places in Shikarpur District